Little Fox may refer to:

The Little Foxes, a 1939 play by Lillian Hellman
The Little Foxes (film), a 1941 adaptation of Lillian Hellman's play of the same name.
Little Foxes, a 1984 book by Michael Morpurgo
The Little Fox, a 1981 Hungarian adaptation of István Fekete's Vuk